Wally Tuck (12 August 1897 – 17 November 1983) was an  Australian rules footballer who played with St Kilda in the Victorian Football League (VFL).

Notes

External links 

1897 births
1983 deaths
Australian rules footballers from Victoria (Australia)
St Kilda Football Club players
People educated at Xavier College